The Téléphérique, owned and operated by Compagnie Libanaise du Telepherique et d' Expansion Touristique SAL, is a bicable gondola lift system located in Jounieh, a city in Lebanon  north of Beirut. It was founded in 1965.

The trips offers "spectacularly dramatic views", including "panoramic views over the Bay of Jounieh". Currently, the round trip ride (tourist) from Jounieh to Harissa on the Téléférique costs £L100,000 or US$2.77. The ride is considered one of the most popular activities for tourists in Jounieh

A virtual visit to the upper station of the Telepherique is located on this link

References

External links
Official Téléphérique website

Transport in Lebanon
Gondola lifts